Kartavya is a 1979 Indian Hindi-language action drama film directed by Mohan Sehgal. The music in the film is composed by Laxmikant-Pyarelal. The film stars Dharmendra, Rekha, Vinod Mehra, Nirupa Roy, Aruna Irani, Ranjeet, Utpal Dutt and Suresh Oberoi. The film is a remake of the 1973 Kannada film Gandhada Gudi.

Cast
Dharmendra as Vijay
Rekha as Neeta
Vinod Mehra as Ajay / Dushyant Rai
Nirupa Roy as Vijay & Ajay's Mother
Aruna Irani as Lachhi
Ranjeet as Jacob
Utpal Dutt as Diwan Dhanpat Rai
Suresh Oberoi as Forest Officer

Crew
Direction – Mohan Sehgal
Production – Mohan Sehgal
Music Direction – Laxmikant–Pyarelal
Lyrics – Varma Malik, Kafil Azar
Playback – Asha Bhosle, Lata Mangeshkar, Mohammed Rafi, Usha Mangeshkar

Mohammed Rafi is the only male singer in the movie who sang with the three Mangeshkar sisters concurrently. (Lata, Asha and Usha)
The Macho man Dharmendra usually preferred Mohd. Rafi sing for him in older movies of 1960.  Later of course. Kishore Kumar sang a lot more hits for Dharamendra in movies like Jugnu, Sholay and Dream girl etc

The film was Super Hit during its release.

Soundtrack

References

External links

1979 films
1970s Hindi-language films
Films scored by Laxmikant–Pyarelal
Hindi remakes of Kannada films